Kuala Jeneris is a small town in Hulu Terengganu District, Terengganu, Malaysia. It is the eastern end of the Ipoh-Kuala Terengganu road Federal Route 185.

Towns in Terengganu